Le Pré is the name or part of the name of five communes of France:
Le Pré-d'Auge in the Calvados département
Le Pré-Saint-Gervais in the Seine-Saint-Denis département
Ivoy-le-Pré in the Cher département
Saint-Martin-sur-le-Pré in the Marne département
Villiers-le-Pré in the Manche département